Yugu Pavilion (Yugu Tai) (Chinese: 郁孤台) is located on Helan Hill (also named: Tianluo Hill, 田螺岭) in the north of Ganzhou City, Jiangxi Province, China. It is among the list of Provincial-Level Scenic and Historic Interest Area of Jiangxi.

History
There is no clear record about when this pavilion was originally built. According to the History of Gan County, it was already existed before Guangde to Dali era (763~779) in Tang Dynasty, when the provincial governor Li Mian (717－788) changed its name to "Wangque". It collapsed about 200 years later. In 1147 (Shaoxing era, Song Dynasty), the regional governor, Zeng Zao (?~1155), built two pavilions on the hill, and named them Yugu and Wangque respectively. After that, Yugu Pavilion was destroyed and rebuilt several times.

In Ming Dynasty, Yugu Pavilion served as the work place of the regional government from Hongwu to Zhengde era.

Present
The penultimate construction was in the Tongzhi era of the Qing Dynasty after a wind disaster in 1869. That building was once restored in 1959, but replaced with a new reinforced concrete-structure one in 1984. The shape of the building is maintained. It is 17 meters tall and has three stories.

References

Ganzhou
Buildings and structures in Jiangxi
Tourist attractions in Jiangxi